The Gadabout was an unusual American automobile manufactured in Newark, New Jersey from 1913 until 1915.  A four-cylinder cyclecar, it had a body woven from so-called "waterproof reeds"; Wise describes it as "looking like a mobile wastepaper basket".

References

 Old Woodies

Defunct motor vehicle manufacturers of the United States